In enzymology, a mannitol dehydrogenase is an enzyme that catalyzes the chemical reaction

D-mannitol + NAD+  D-mannose + NADH + H+

Thus, the two substrates of this enzyme are D-mannitol and NAD+, whereas its 3 products are D-mannose, NADH, and H+.

This enzyme belongs to the family of oxidoreductases, specifically those acting on the CH-OH group of donor with NAD+ or NADP+ as acceptor. The systematic name of this enzyme class is mannitol:NAD+ 1-oxidoreductase. Other names in common use include MTD, and NAD+-dependent mannitol dehydrogenase.

References

See also 
 D-Mannitol

EC 1.1.1
NADH-dependent enzymes
Enzymes of unknown structure